Christopher Hope may refer to:

Chris Hope (American football) (born 1980), American football safety
Chris Hope (footballer) (born 1972), English footballer
Christopher Hope (journalist) (born 1971), British journalist
Christopher Hope (novelist) (born 1944), South African novelist and poet